This is a list of magazines published in Canada.

References

Canada

Magazines